In genetic algorithms and genetic programming defining length L(H) is the maximum distance between two defining symbols (that is symbols that have a fixed value as opposed to symbols that can take any value, commonly denoted as # or *) in schema H. In tree GP schemata, L(H) is the number of links in the minimum tree fragment including all the non-= symbols within a schema H.

Example 

Schemata "00##0", "1###1", "01###", and "##0##" have defining lengths of 4, 4, 1, and 0, respectively. Lengths are computed by determining the last fixed position and subtracting from it the first fixed position.

In genetic algorithms as the defining length of a solution increases so does the susceptibility of the solution to disruption due to mutation or cross-over.

References 

Genetic algorithms